Chiprana is a municipality located in the province of Zaragoza, Aragon, Spain. According to the 2004 census (INE), the municipality has a population of 368 inhabitants. Its climate ranges over the course of the year, from 3°C to 34°C.

References

Municipalities in the Province of Zaragoza